Georgi Todorov Kaloyanchev (January 13, 1925 – December 18, 2012) was a Bulgarian actor. He was born in the city of Burgas. He studied in the former theatrical school in Sofia. Immediately after graduating he started playing in the Ivan Vazov National Theatre. His first role was in the movie Utro nad rodinata (1951) where he stars as the Gypsy Sali.

Full filmography
  Rapsodiya v byalo (2002) as an Old man
in Bulgarian: Рапсодия в бяло;
in English: Rhapsody in White 
  Golemite igri (1999) as Mr. Spiridonov
in Bulgarian: Големите игри; 
in English: The Big Games 
   Sled kraja na sveta (1998) as Father Isiah
in Bulgarian: След края на Света;
in English: After the End of the World; 
in Greek: Meta to telos tou kosmou; 
in German: Nach dem Ende der Welt )
   Urnebesna tragedija (1994) as Taxi Driver
in French: Tragédie burlesque 
   Fatalna nezhnost (1993)
in Bulgarian: Фатална нежност; 
in English: Fatal Tenderness 
   Pantudi (1993)
in Bulgarian: Пантуди; 
in English: Pantudi 
   Bai Ganio tragva iz Evropa (1991) as Bai Ganio
in Bulgarian: Бай Ганьо тръгва из Европа; 
in English: Bai Ganyo on His Way to Europe 
   Pod igoto (1990) TV Series as Hadzhi Smion
in Bulgarian: Под игото; 
in English: Under the Yoke 
   Bai Ganio (1990) as Ganio Balkansky
in Bulgarian: Бай Ганьо; 
in English: Bai Ganio 
   Balkanska perestrojka (1990)  as Dr. Rajser
   Karnavalat (1990) as Carnaval manager
in Bulgarian: Карнавалът; 
in English: The Carnival 
   Brachni shegi (1989) as Reader Stefan Stefanov
in Bulgarian: Брачни шеги; 
in English: Marital Jokes 
   Zaplahata (1989) as the Old man
in Bulgarian: Заплахата; 
in English: The Threat 
   Masmediologija na Balkanu (1989)
   Izlozhenie 1951(1988) as Bay Miho
in Bulgarian: Изложение; 
in English: Report 
   Noshtem po pokrivite (1988) (TV)
in Bulgarian: Нощем по покривите; 
in English: On the Roofs at Night 
   Dom za nashite deca (1987) TV Series as Konstantin Vanchilov
in Bulgarian: Дом за нашите деца; 
in English: Home for Our Children 
   Vreme za pat (1987) TV Series as Konstantin Vanchilov
in Bulgarian: Време за път;
in English: Time for Traveling 
   Samo ti, sartze (1987) as Head Doctor, Vasil
in Bulgarian: Само ти, сърце; 
in English: Only You, My Heart 
   Za kude putuvate (1986) as Bay Denyo
in Bulgarian: За къде пътувате; 
in English: Where Are You Going? 
   Eshelonite (1986) as the Baker
in Bulgarian: Ешелоните на смъртта; 
in English: Transports of Death 
   Harakteristika (1985) as Bay Luko
in Bulgarian: Характеристика ;
in English: Reference 
   Yan Bibiyan (1985) as the Priest
in Bulgarian: Ян Бибиян ;
in English: Yan Bibiyan 
   Otkoga te chakam (1984) as Bank Cashier
in Bulgarian: Откога те чакам ;
in English: It's Nice to See You 
   Bon shans, inspektore! (1983) as the Mayor
in Bulgarian: Бон шанс, инспекторе! ;
in English: Bonne Chance, Inspector! 
   Falshifikatorat ot "Cherniya kos" (1983) TV Series
in Bulgarian: Фалшификаторът от `Черния кос` ;
in English: The Blackbird Forger
   Byala magiya (1982) as God
in Bulgarian: Бяла магия ;
in English: White Magic 
   Noshtnite bdeniya na pop Vecherko(1980) as the Mayor
in Bulgarian: Нощните бдения на поп Вечерко ;
in English: Priest Vecherko's Nights Wakefulness 
   Kashtata (1979)
in Bulgarian: Къщата ;
in English: The House 
   Byagay... Obicham te (1979) as Kalata
in Bulgarian: Бягай... Обичам те ;
in English: Run Away... I Love You 
   Royalat (1979) as the Tooth
in Bulgarian: Роялът ;
in English: Grand Piano 
   Baseynat (1977)
in Bulgarian: Басейнът ;
in English: The Swimming Pool 
   Lebed (1976) as Stoyanov
in Bulgarian: Лебед ;
in English: Swan 
   Momicheto s harmonichkata (1976) as Dzhambazina
in Bulgarian: Момичето с хармоничката ;
in English: The Girl with the Harmonica 
   Na zhivot i smart (1974) (TV)
in Bulgarian: На живот и смърт;
in English: Life or Death 
   Krivorazbranata tsivilizatsiya (1974) (TV musical)
in Bulgarian: Криворазбраната цивилизация;
in English: The Phoney Civilization
   Vechni vremena (1974)
in Bulgarian: Вечни времена ;
in English: Eternal Times 
   Byagstvo v Ropotamo (1973) as Bay Manol
in Bulgarian:Бягство в Ропотамо ;
in English: Flight to the Ropotamo 
   Igrek 17(1973) as the Grandfather
in Bulgarian: Игрек 17 ;
in English: Y-17 
   Wrathful Journey (1971) as Chavdar's Father
in Bulgarian: Гневно пътуване ;
   Otkradnatiyat vlak (1971) as colonel Tushev
in Bulgarian: Откраднатият влак ;
in English: The Stolen Train 
   Demonat na imperiyata (1971) TV Series as Ibrahim aga
in Bulgarian: Демонът на империята ;
in English: The Demon of the Empire 
   Ezop (1970) as Aesop
in Bulgarian: Езоп ;
in English: Aesop 
   Whale (1970) as Parushev
in Bulgarian: Кит ;
in English: Whale 
   Galileo (1968) as Giordano Bruno
in Bulgarian: Галилео Галилей ;
in English: Galileo Galilei 
   Nebeto na Veleka (1968) as Lazar
in Bulgarian: Небето на Велека ;
in English: The Sky Over the Veleka 
   Byalata staya (1968) as Clown
in Bulgarian: Бялата стая ;
in English: The White Room 
   The Tied Up Balloon (1967) as Peasant
in Bulgarian: Привързаният балон ;
   Nay-dalgata nosht (1967) as Juggler
in Bulgarian: Най-дългата нощ ;
in English: The Longest Night 
   Dzhesi Dzeyms sreshtu Lokum Shekerov (1966)) as Jesse James
in Bulgarian: Джеси Джеймс срещу Локум Шекеров ;
in English: Jesse James vs. Lokum Shekerov 
   Valchitsata(1965) as Kondov
in Bulgarian: Вълчицата 
in English: The She-Wolf 
   Rusiyat i Gugutkata (1965) as the Turtle-dove
in Bulgarian: Русият и Гугутката ;
in English: The Blonde and the Turtle-Dove 
   Neveroyatna istoriya (1964) as Fire department Chief
in Bulgarian: Невероятна история ;
in English: Incredible Story 
   Inspektorat i noshtta (1963) as The Inspector
in Bulgarian: Инспекторът и нощта ;
in English: The Inspector and the Night 
   Zlatniyat zab (1962) as Miliya
in Bulgarian: Златният зъб ;
in English: The Golden Tooth 
   Tobacco (1962)
in Bulgarian: Тютюн ;
   Spetzialist po vsichko (1962) as Spiro
in Bulgarian: Специалист по всичко ;
in English: Jack-of-All-Trades 
   First Lesson (1960) as Vaskata
in Bulgarian: Първи урок ;
   Malkata (1959) as Mircho
in Bulgarian: Малката ;
in English: The Little Girl 
   Rebro Adamovo (1958) as the Miner
in Bulgarian: Ребро Адамово ;
in English: Adam's Rib 
   Godini za lyubov (1957)
in Bulgarian: Години за любов ;
in English: Years of Love 
   A Lesson in History (1957) as Van der Lyube
in Bulgarian: Урокът на историята ;
   Dve pobedi (1956)
in Bulgarian: Две победи ;
in English: Two Victories 
   Item One (1956)
in Bulgarian: Точка първа ;
   Dimitrovgradtsy (1956) as Shteriu Barabata
in Bulgarian: Димитровградци ;
in English: People of Dimitrovgrad 
   Snaha (1954)
in Bulgarian: Снаха ;
in English: Daughter-In-Law 
   Nasha zemya (1952) as Petko Shiloto
in Bulgarian: Наша земя ;
in English: Our Land 
   Utro nad Rodinata (1951) as Sali
in Bulgarian: Утро над Родината
in English: Dawn Over the Homeland

References

External links
 

1925 births
2012 deaths
Bulgarian male film actors
Bulgarian male stage actors
Actors from Burgas
20th-century Bulgarian male actors
21st-century Bulgarian male actors